The Quickstep 24 is an American trailerable sailboat that was designed by Edward S. Brewer as a cruiser and first built in 1976.

Production
The design was initially built by Stannard Boat Works in Rhode Island, United States. After 23 boats were completed the molds were purchased by Bill Lannigan, the marketing director for C. E. Ryder and that company built a number of the boats. Lannigan then left the company and had boats built by The Anchorage and Shannon Yachts. Construction of the design then passed to Quickstep Sailboats. Production ran from 1976 until 1989 with 200 boats completed.

Design
The Quickstep 24 is a recreational keelboat, that was designed to be built with an aluminum hull, but all production boats were built of fiberglass, with wood trim. It has a masthead sloop rig, a raked stem, a rounded transom, a skeg-mounted rudder controlled by a tiller and a fixed fin keel. It displaces  and carries  of cast lead ballast.

The boat is normally fitted with a small  outboard motor mounted in a stern well, for docking and maneuvering.

The design has sleeping accommodation for either two or four people, depending on version. Early production boats had just a double "V"-berth in the bow cabin and a main cabin seat with the head located underneath it. On these early configuration boats the galley is located on the port side just forward of the companionway ladder and is equipped with a single-burner stove, a built-in icebox and a sink. Later boats added two main cabin quarter berths, at the expense of the gallery space and moved the head under the bow "V"-berth insert. On later boats the galley is just aft of the bow cabin and has a sink on the starboard side and ice box to port.

Operational history
The boat is supported by an active class club, the Quickstep Owners Group.

In a 2010 review Steve Henkel wrote, "this good-looking vessel made the rounds among several builders ... The boats were (with some exceptions) well built and well finished. Early accommodations were finished [with only a bow cabin, while] later production added quarter berths, which squeezed the galley space. Best features: With her longish keel and attached rudder, she wants to track a straight course and can be made to self-steer fairly easily, helping to make her a good singlehander. She is reported to handle a chop and a fresh breeze better than the average 24-footer. Her cockpit is large and comfortable. Worst features: Making a quick sharp turns may require an assist from the outboard (the other side of the coin from good tracking ability). Some owners (the ones with the quarter berths) complain of cramped accommodations."

See also
List of sailing boat types

Related development
Quickstep 19
Quickstep 21

References

Keelboats
1970s sailboat type designs
Sailing yachts
Trailer sailers
Sailboat type designs by Edward S. Brewer
Sailboat types built by Quickstep Sailboats
Sailboat types built by Shannon Yachts
Sailboat types built by Stannard Boat Works
Sailboat types built by C. E. Ryder